Jamar Summers (born June 14, 1995) is an American football cornerback who is currently a free agent. He played college football at University of Connecticut.

Early years 
Summers grew up in Orange, New Jersey, where he attended Orange High School. After graduating, he spent a year at post-secondary school Milford Academy in New Berlin, New York. As a cornerback, he was rated a three-star recruit by Rivals.com and a two-star recruit by ESPN and committed to play college football at Connecticut.

College career 
Summers played all twelve games as a true freshman, starting the final five of the season. In his sophomore year, he started twelve of thirteen games, recording eight interceptions and 39 tackles, including a 67-yard interception return for a touchdown, earning first-team All-American Athletic Conference honors.

As a junior, he started all twelve games, playing both cornerback and safety, recording two interceptions and 59 tackles, plus an 86-yard fumble recovery for a touchdown. Finally, as a senior, he recorded a career-high 63 tackles, in addition to one interception.

Professional career

Pittsburgh Steelers
After going undrafted in the 2018 NFL Draft, Summers signed as an undrafted free agent with the Pittsburgh Steelers. He played in all four preseason games, allowing three receptions with two pass breakups on ten targets, but was cut prior to the regular season.

Birmingham Iron
On October 12, 2018, Summers was signed by the Birmingham Iron. In his debut against the Memphis Express, he allowed one reception for -2 yards, along with one interception and one pass breakup on three targets. He again impressed in week 2 against the Salt Lake Stallions, when he forced a fumble on a punt return that was recovered by teammate Shaheed Salmon for a touchdown, sparking a comeback victory for the Iron. For this, he was named Week 2 AAF Special Teams Player of the Week.

Miami Dolphins
After the AAF ceased operations in April 2019, Summers signed with the Miami Dolphins on May 12, 2019. He was waived on July 21, 2019.

Detroit Lions
On August 12, 2019, Summers signed with the Detroit Lions. He was waived during final roster cuts on August 30, 2019.

New York Guardians
Summers was drafted in the 1st round during phase four in the 2020 XFL Draft by the New York Guardians. He had his contract terminated when the league suspended operations on April 10, 2020.

Houston Gamblers
Summers was selected in the eight round of the 2022 USFL Draft by the Houston Gamblers. He was transferred to the inactive roster on April 30, 2022, with a leg injury. He was moved back to the active roster on May 14.

Statistics

Source:

References

External links
 Connecticut bio

1995 births
Living people
American football cornerbacks
Birmingham Iron players
Miami Dolphins players
Pittsburgh Steelers players
Detroit Lions players
New York Guardians players
Orange High School (New Jersey) alumni
Players of American football from New Jersey
Sportspeople from Essex County, New Jersey
People from Orange, New Jersey
UConn Huskies football players
Houston Gamblers (2022) players